The KNT-308 is indigenous .308 caliber (7.62mm) sniper rifle  designed by Kalekalıp of Turkey.  KNT-308 stands for Keskin Nişancı Tüfeği 308 - Sharpshooter Rifle 308. Effective range of is 800 meters. It has been claimed to be 20% more effective than other bolt-action rifles of its class, and 30% lighter with its 5.35 kilograms weight. It is also marketed as 30% cheaper than its counterparts. It costs $2,000 but with additional accessories it can cost $15,000-20,000. The KNT-308 will reportedly be used in the ongoing conflict between Turkey and the PKK in Eastern Turkey and Northern Iraq. It was displayed at the International Defence Industry Fair in 2009.

7.62×51mm NATO rifles
Sniper rifles of Turkey
Bolt-action rifles